Pinal Mountains National Forest was established as the Pinal Mountains Forest Reserve by the U.S. Forest Service in Arizona on March 20, 1905 with . It became a National Forest on March 4, 1907 and encompassed the entirety of the Pinal Mountains south of Globe, Arizona and some areas surrounding the mountains. On January 13, 1908 the forest was combined with Tonto National Forest and the name was discontinued.

References

External links
 Forest History Society
 Listing of the National Forests of the United States and Their Dates (from Forest History Society website) Text from Davis, Richard C., ed. Encyclopedia of American Forest and Conservation History. New York: Macmillan Publishing Company for the Forest History Society, 1983. Vol. II, pp. 743–788.
  

Former National Forests of Arizona
Tonto National Forest